The men's middleweight (75 kg/165 lbs) Thai-Boxing division at the W.A.K.O. European Championships 2006 in Skopje was the fifth heaviest of the male Thai-Boxing tournaments involving eight fighters.  Each of the matches was three rounds of two minutes each and were fought under Thai-Boxing rules.  

The tournament gold medal was won by Yury Harbachov of Belarus who beat Russia's Mikhail Chalykh in the final.  Defeated semi finalists Kamel Mezatni of France and Aleksandre Stajkovski of hosts Macedonia both claimed bronze medals for their efforts in reaching the semi final stage.

Results

Key

See also
List of WAKO Amateur European Championships
List of WAKO Amateur World Championships
List of male kickboxers

References

External links
 WAKO World Association of Kickboxing Organizations Official Site

W.A.K.O. European Championships 2006 (Skopje)